Lake Amatitlán (Lago Amatitlán) is a lake located within the Amatitlán caldera in south-central Guatemala, fairly close to Guatemala City. It lies in the central highlands, 1,186 m (3890 feet) above sea level. Its maximum depth is 33 m (108 feet) and an average of 18 m (59 feet).

The lake's primary inflow is the Villalobos River, and the lake is drained by the Michatoya River, an important tributary of the María Linda River. The town of Amatitlán is situated at the head of the Michatoya river. A dam with a railway on top was constructed at the narrowest point, thus effectively dividing the lake into two water bodies with different physical, chemical and biological characteristics: a north-western and a south-eastern basin.

The lake is used as a water source, for navigation and transportation, sightseeing and tourism (10,000 visitors annually), recreation (swimming, sport-fishing, water skiing, yachting) and fisheries.

History

As of 1850, the lake was used as a bathing lake and a resort area in the spring. Nearby hot springs were also popular with visitors.

Economy

In the mid 19th century, the lake was plentiful with crawfish, sardines, and other seafood. The seafood was captured and sold for the local region, as seafood was rarely imported into the area.

Pollution
Amatitlán lake's catchment area includes Guatemala City. Each year large quantities of untreated sewage, industrial waste and a staggering 500,000 tons of sediment are carried into the lake through the Villalobos River. This has contributed to high levels of pollution of the lake's water, and an accelerated eutrophication and siltation. This has seriously affected the lake's former function as a source of drinking water and irrigation, and reduced its recreational functions.

In the early 1990s under President Jorge Serrano Elias, a deal was made with a German company to use specialized machinery to clean the lake.  But  while the lake was already half way cleaned, corrupt political rivals staged a coup with the help of Soap and detergent manufacturers who were contaminating the lake along with other Guatemalan businesses and kick him out of office and the deal was canceled, and the lake was never cleaned and all other attempts to clean it have been futile. 

In early 2015, the Lake Amatitlan Authority commission granted a contract to the Israeli company M. Tarcic Engineering Ltd. for 137.8 million quetzals, to purchase 93 000 liters of an alleged decontaminant that it would apply to Lake Amatitlán. However, after complains and legal action from scientists, academia, politicians and environmentalists who questioned the Israeli company contract, then vice president Roxana Baldetti suspended the project on 30 March 2015 and froze both the payment to the company and any decontaminant pouring into the lake. Furthermore, Baldetti was forced to resign in early May 2015 due to the La Linea corruption case.

Gallery

Notes and references

References

Bibliography

External links
 Instituto Nacional de Sismología, Vulcanología, Meteorología e Hidrolagía (INSIVUMEH)
 Global Nature Fund - Lake Amatitlan - Guatemala

Lakes of Guatemala
Volcanic crater lakes
Calderas of Central America
Volcanoes of Guatemala